The Hitachi Monorail System refers to the family of monorails offered by Hitachi Rail.

List of notable Hitachi monorails

Hitachi's designs are ALWEG-based, and are available in three configurations:

All Hitachi trains except those on Japan's oldest operational monorail have floors entirely above all the wheels.

Large
 Kitakyushu Monorail, opened 1984
 Osaka Monorail, opened 1990
 Tama Toshi Monorail Line, opened 1998
 Line 2 & Line 3, Chongqing Rail Transit (China), opened 2005 & 2011 (Changchun Railway Vehicles Co., Ltd. also took part in the designing)

Standard
Tokyo Monorail, opened 1964
Okinawa Urban Monorail, opened 2003
Palm Jumeirah Monorail, (Dubai, United Arab Emirates) opened April 2009
Daegu Metro Line 3, (Daegu, South Korea) opened April 2015 (prototype set only, remaining 27 built by Woojin Industrial Systems)

Small
Sentosa Express (Sentosa, Singapore), opened 2007

Panama Metro Line 3 Project
The project is financed by a loan from the Japanese government. Construction on the line commenced in 2021 and is expected to be completed by 2025

Picture gallery

References

 Hitachi
Monorails
Hitachi Rail
Monorails by manufacturer